The McKenzie County Farmer is a weekly newspaper published in Watford City, North Dakota, United States. It serves Watford City and McKenzie County.

External links

Newspapers published in North Dakota
McKenzie County, North Dakota
Publications established in 1908
1908 establishments in North Dakota